Greatest Hits Volume 2 is the third compilation album by singer-songwriter James Taylor released in 2000. It was a follow-up to his first Greatest Hits album released in 1976.

Track listing
All songs by James Taylor unless otherwise noted.
"Secret O' Life" – 3:35
"Handy Man" (Otis Blackwell, Jimmy Jones) – 3:17
"Your Smiling Face" – 2:46
"Up on the Roof" (Gerry Goffin, Carole King) – 4:21
"Her Town Too" (Duet with J.D. Souther) (J.D. Souther, James Taylor, Waddy Wachtel) – 4:36
"That's Why I'm Here" – 3:38
"Only A Dream In Rio" – 5:03
"Everyday" (Buddy Holly, Norman Petty) – 3:17
"Song For You Far Away" – 2:58
"Never Die Young" – 4:23
"(I've Got To) Stop Thinkin' 'Bout That" (Danny Kortchmar, James Taylor) – 4:00
"Copperline" (Reynolds Price, James Taylor) – 4:19
"Shed a Little Light (Live, 1993)" – 4:22
"Another Day" – 2:23
"Little More Time With You" – 3:52
"Enough To Be On Your Way" – 5:28

Japan Bonus Track
"You Can Close Your Eyes" (Live, 1998) – 2:55

Personnel
James Taylor – Guitars, vocals, backing vocals
Dave Bargeron – Trombone
Randy Brecker – Trumpet, vocals
Rosemary Butler – Vocals
Clifford Carter – Organ, synthesizer, piano, keyboards, Fender Rhodes
Valerie Carter – Vocals
Luis Conte – Percussion, tambourine, cabasa
Jerry Douglas – Dobro
Dan Dugmore – Banjo, guitars, pedal steel
Elaine Eliaf – Vocals
Kenia Gould – Vocals
Don Grolnick – Piano
Lani Groves – Vocals
Jimmy Johnson – Bass
Steve Jordan – Drums
Danny Kortchmar – Electric guitar
Leah Kunkel – Vocals (background)
Russell Kunkel – Drums
Michael Landau – Guitars
David Lasley – Vocals
Tony Levin – Bass
Yo-Yo Ma – Cello
Jimmy Maelen – Percussion
Bobby Mann – Electric guitar
Kate Markowitz – Vocals
Rick Marotta – Drums
Arnold McCuller – Vocals
Steven Edney – Vocals
Dr. Clarence McDonald – Piano
Bob Mintzer – Sax (Tenor)
Airto Moreira – Percussion
Mark O'Connor – Fiddle, violin
Billy Payne – Keyboards
Ed Rockett – Penny whistle
David Sanborn – Saxophone
Rick Shlosser – Drums
Leland Sklar – Bass
J.D. Souther – Vocals
Carlos Vega – Percussion, drums
Waddy Wachtel – Guitars
Deniece Williams – Vocals
Stevie Wonder – Harmonica
George Ybara – Assistant
Zbeto – Vocals

Source Material
1-3 JT
4 Flag
5 Dad Love's His Work
6-9 That's Why I'm Here
10 Never Die Young
11-12 New Moon Shine
13 Live
14-16 Hourglass

References

2000 greatest hits albums
Albums produced by Peter Asher
Albums produced by Frank Filipetti
James Taylor compilation albums
Columbia Records compilation albums